Sangishi (Sangisi) is a rural locality (a selo) in Aleksandriysky Selsoviet, Kizlyarsky District, Republic of Dagestan, Russia. The population was 467 as of 2010. There are 4 streets.

Geography 
Sangishi is located 41 km northeast of Kizlyar (the district's administrative centre) by road. Chernyayevka and Aleksandriyskaya are the nearest rural localities.

Nationalities 
Nogais and Dargins live there.

References 

Rural localities in Kizlyarsky District